Sam's Town is the second studio album by American rock band the Killers. It was released on September 27, 2006, by Island Records. Regarding the album, frontman Brandon Flowers noted that he "wanted to create an album that captured, chronologically, everything important that got me to where I am today". Sam's Town has sold almost five million copies worldwide.

On October 7, 2016, Sam's Town was reissued as a remastered double vinyl by Bong Load Records, celebrating the 10th anniversary of the album. The reissue is limited to 5,016 copies and includes two bonus tracks—the previously unreleased demo "Peace of Mind" and a Pet Shop Boys remix of "Read My Mind".

Background
The album takes its name from Sam's Town Hotel and Gambling Hall, a hotel and casino in Las Vegas, the band's hometown. Sam's Town was also a huge sign that was visible to band member Mark Stoermer through his room window when he was young.

Artwork
According to photographer Anton Corbijn, the band initially wanted a "chic, gypsy look" for the album, and that "out of those discussions [for the sleeve] came these elements of faded glory." The album's co-producer, Flood, is dressed as a Native American in the CD booklet. The artwork inside the album booklet is taken from a Downtown Las Vegas mural painted by Suzanne Hackett-Morgan, a local painter. The cover artwork of Sam's Town features model and singer Felice LaZae. It also features a Desert bighorn sheep, the state mammal and popular symbol of Nevada, from where the Killers are from.

Production
The album is said to be influenced by the works of U2, Duran Duran, Bruce Springsteen, the Beatles, Tom Petty and the Heartbreakers, Electric Light Orchestra, and Dire Straits, among others. In the October 2006 issue of Giant magazine, Flowers was quoted as saying that Sam's Town would be "one of the best albums in the past twenty years", and in Entertainment Weekly he remarked that it would be "the album that keeps rock & roll afloat."

Flowers later said of production techniques used on the record, "We didn't use too many vocal effects. On the first album, we used auto-tune, and I didn't even realize what was going on with these machines and the computer. I was adamant about not using it this time. You really hear what my voice sounds like, for the first time." At one point, Flowers was told that Brian Eno had passed over the chance to produce the album, a rejection that affected Brandon greatly. However, when working with Eno for Wonderful Wonderful, Eno told him that he was never offered the project in the first place.

Tour

Christian Hoard of Rolling Stone gave the Killers' concert at Madison Square Garden three-and-a-half stars, saying, "The Vegas quartet's maligned new album, Sam's Town, might pack more unfortunate big-rock bombast than its new wave debut, Hot Fuss, but it shares a generous hook quotient and a Vegas-y talent for crowd-pleasing. Before a frothy crowd, the Killers proved they've become a tight live band."

Critical reception

Sam's Town received generally positive reviews from music critics. At Metacritic, which assigns a normalized rating out of 100 to reviews from mainstream publications, the album received an average score of 64, based on 32 reviews.

Dan Martin of The Observer awarded the album five out of five stars and noted the album's sonic similarity to Born to Run by Bruce Springsteen, writing: "Improbably, this proves to be their masterstroke. Selling Springsteen back to his homeland might look like a canny way of ensuring radio play, but there's no disputing the quality of their songs. Indeed, as Hot Fuss sporadically intimated, the Killers are among pop's foremost practitioners." Comparing Sam's Town to the band's debut album Hot Fuss, Martin stated: "Crucially, Sam's Town sounds like a complete collection, with a far better strike rate than its predecessor."

In a review for NME, Krissi Murison highlighted both the similarities to Hot Fuss and the evolution of the band's sound from the debut to Sam's Town, concluding: "All this, however, isn't to say that The Killers have gone all (God forbid) serious on us. The tunes may be huger, the influences cleverer, the lyrics more adventurous and the band more self-assured, but their primary concern is still being the biggest indie-pop stars on the planet. For all their smart new ways, The Killers are still as flashy, unintentionally funny, and flagrantly affected as ever – and this time we wouldn't even pretend to have it any other way."

Conversely, Sia Michel of The New York Times called the album "painful" and ends the review with the statement that "The Killers are a talented band that evolved too fast, for the wrong reasons." Similarly, Rob Sheffield of Rolling Stone noted a significant departure from Hot Fuss, writing that on Sam's Town, the band "ditch[es] their cheerfully fake Bowie moves and try to get heavy by copying Bruce Springsteen. Yes, that means glockenspiel solos. Yes, it means anthems about the road and looking for America and girls named Mary. No, it's not a good move."

In later years, the album gained a cult following and has been critically lauded as a classic and one of the best rock albums of the 2000s. Despite its two-star rating by Rolling Stone, Sam's Town was voted by the magazine's readers in December 2009 as the most underrated album of the decade. Q magazine ranked it as the 11th best album of the 21st century. In a retrospective for Uproxx, Steven Hyden broaches the issue of pannings by notable media outlets such as Rolling Stone, arguing that these pannings have ultimately cemented the album's status as a classic: "Ten years removed from its original moment, Sam's Town has aged as all misunderstood sorta-classics do, where its deficiencies are now strengths. [...] A record that was risible to some because its attendant hype was so overbearing now has the appeal of a mistreated underdog. Against all odds, the narrative came around on Sam's Town." Writing for MTV News, James Montgomery would theorize that the initial backlash to the album caused the band to change direction with their follow up album, Day & Age, calling the latter "the most un-Sam's Town album imaginable."

Accolades

Commercial performance
Sam's Town debuted at number two on the US Billboard 200, selling 315,000 copies in its first week. , the album had sold 1.3 million copies in the United States. It became the band's second number-one album on the UK Albums Chart, selling 268,946 copies in its first week. It had sold 1.57 million copies in the United Kingdom by July 2017. The album has been certified Platinum or multi-Platinum in the US, UK, Australia, Canada, and Ireland. Sam's Town also produced multiple charting singles including the platinum chart-topping single "When You Were Young". , Sam's Town had sold almost five million copies worldwide.

Popular culture
Six months after the death of American YouTuber Technoblade, his father revealed on the r/technoblade subreddit that, in his son's instructions for the video that would announce his death, he included a link to a joint YouTube video of the songs Enterlude and Exitlude. Technoblade's father was unsure of how his son wanted the song to be inserted into the video and did not include it due to problems it could cause with copyright.

Popular Twitch streamer xQc has regularly used Exitlude as outro music for his streams.

Track listing
All tracks are produced by Flood, Alan Moulder and the Killers.

Personnel
Credits adapted from the liner notes of Sam's Town.

Studios
 Studio at the Palms (Las Vegas, Nevada) – recording
 Criterion Studios (London) – additional recording
 Assault & Battery (London) – mixing
 Masterdisk (New York City) – mastering

The Killers
 Dave Keuning
 Mark Stoermer
 Brandon Flowers
 Ronnie Vannucci Jr.

Additional musicians

 Corlene Byrd – backing vocals 
 Louis XIV – backing vocals 
 Tommy Marth – saxophones
 Neeraj Khajanchi – trombone
 Adrina Hanson – strings
 Maryam Haddad – strings
 Tristan Moyer – strings

Technical

 Flood – production, recording, mixing
 Alan Moulder – production, recording, mixing
 The Killers – production
 Mark Gray – additional engineering
 Neeraj Khajanchi – additional engineering
 Max Dingel – additional engineering
 Andy Savours – mix engineering
 Howie Weinberg – mastering

Artwork
 Andy West – art direction, design
 Anton Corbijn – photography
 Kristen Yiengst – photo, art coordination
 Doug Joswick – package production

Charts

Weekly charts

Year-end charts

Decade-end charts

Certifications and sales

Release history

References

2006 albums
Albums produced by Alan Moulder
Albums produced by Flood (producer)
Brit Award for International Album
Concept albums
Island Records albums
The Killers albums
Vertigo Records albums